Carl Saunders (born 26 November 1964) is a former professional footballer, who spent most of his career at Stoke City and Bristol Rovers.

Career
Saunders was born in Birmingham and began his career with Stoke City making his debut as a substitute in a 3–1 defeat in 1982–83. He played 27 times in 1984–85 scoring his first senior goal against Manchester United to earn Stoke a 2–1. However that was a rare highlight that season as Stoke were relegated with a record low points tally. He scored three goals in 44 matches in 1985–86 before finding good goalscoring form in 1986–87. Saunders formed a fine partnership with Nicky Morgan and he top-scored with 19 goals. However, he lost his form and in his next three seasons at the Victoria Ground he scored just six goals before being sold to Bristol Rovers by Alan Ball in February 1990.

He rediscovered he goalscoring form at Bristol Rovers scoring 50 goals in 163 matches helping the Pirates win the Football League Third Division in 1989–90. After leaving Bristol Rovers in December 1993, he had brief spells as a non-contract player with Oxford United and Walsall, before moving to Malta to join Sliema Wanderers and then Hibernians.

Career statistics
Source:

A.  The "Other" column constitutes appearances and goals in the Anglo-Italian Cup, Football League Trophy and Full Members Cup.

Honours
 Bristol Rovers
 Football League Third Division champions: 1989–90
 Football League Trophy runner-up: 1990

References

External links
 

1964 births
Living people
Footballers from Birmingham, West Midlands
English footballers
Association football forwards
Stoke City F.C. players
Bristol Rovers F.C. players
Oxford United F.C. players
Walsall F.C. players
Sliema Wanderers F.C. players
Hibernians F.C. players
English Football League players
Expatriate footballers in Malta
English expatriate footballers